Harry Poole (23 March 1935 – 26 March 1977) was an English professional rugby league footballer who played in the 1950s and 1960s, and coached in the 1970s.

Background 
Harry Poole was born in Castleford, West Riding of Yorkshire, England, and he died aged 42 of a myocardial infarction (heart attack) in Pontefract, West Yorkshire, England.

Playing career

International honours 
Harry Poole won caps for Great Britain while at Hull Kingston Rovers in 1964 against France, and in 1966 against New Zealand (2 matches).

Challenge Cup Final appearances
Harry Poole played , and was captain in Hull Kingston Rovers' 5-13 defeat by Widnes in the 1963–64 Challenge Cup Final during the 1963–64 season at Wembley Stadium, London on Saturday 9 May 1964, in front of a crowd of 84,488.

Eastern Division Championship Final appearances 
Harry Poole played, and was captain in Hull Kingston Rovers' 13-10 victory over Huddersfield in the Eastern Division Championship final during the 1962–63 season at Headingley Rugby Stadium, Leeds on Saturday 10 November 1962.

County Cup Final appearances 
Harry Poole played , and was captain in Hull Kingston Rovers' 2-12 defeat by Hunslet in the 1962–63 Yorkshire County Cup Final during the 1962–63 season at Headingley, Rugby Stadium, Leeds on Saturday 27 October 1962.
This was before substitutes were allowed, and Rovers finished up with 9 men after 4 players were injured.

Coaching career

County Cup Final appearances 
Harry Poole was the coach in Castleford's 7-11 defeat by Hull Kingston Rovers in the 1971–72 Yorkshire County Cup Final during the 1971–72 season at Belle Vue, Wakefield on Saturday 21 August 1971.

Club career 
Harry Poole was the coach of Hunslet in the late 1960s and early 1970s, he was the coach of Castleford, his first game in charge was on 6 January 1971, and his last game in charge was on 30 April 1972, and he was the coach of Hull Kingston Rovers until his death on 26 March 1977.

References

External links 
 !Great Britain Statistics at englandrl.co.uk (statistics currently missing due to not having appeared for both Great Britain, and England)
 (archived by web.archive.org) Hull Kingston Rovers ~ Captains
 Rugby League Final 1964
Search for "Harry Poole" at britishnewspaperarchive.co.uk

1935 births
1977 deaths
Castleford Tigers coaches
English rugby league coaches
English rugby league players
Great Britain national rugby league team captains
Great Britain national rugby league team players
Hull Kingston Rovers captains
Hull Kingston Rovers coaches
Hull Kingston Rovers players
Hunslet F.C. (1883) coaches
Hunslet F.C. (1883) players
Rugby league locks
Rugby league players from Castleford
Rugby league second-rows